Wilce is a surname. Notable people with the surname include:

John Wilce (1888–1963), American football player and coach, physician, and university professor
Ysabeau S. Wilce, American author